The Dinaane Debut Fiction Award – formerly the European Union Literary Award – is a South African literary award, open to South African and SADC writers who are residents of these countries. The manuscripts that are submitted must be a first, unpublished work of fiction in English, or translations of other South African languages into English providing the work has not been published in other languages. The word "dinaane" means "telling our stories together" in Setswana, says Jacana.

In 2015, the European Union Literary Award was renamed the Dinaane Debut Fiction Award. It is supported by various European Union embassies and commissions operating in South Africa. The winner is awarded a cash prize of R35 000.00 along with publication of their manuscript with Jacana Media. In honour of Gerald Kraak, who helped run Jacana Media until his death in 2014, the Kraak Writing Grant is also awarded. The grant is awarded to an entrant whose manuscript showed great promise and who would most benefit from a three-month mentorship with an industry-leading mentor. The Dinaane Debut Fiction Award was first given in 2004.

Winners
European Union Literary Award 
2004: Ishtiyaq Shukri, The Silent Minaret
2005: Fred Khumalo, Bitches' Brew; and Gerald Kraak, Ice in the Lungs
2006: [no award]
2007: Kopano Matlwa, Coconut 
2008: Megan Voysey-Braig, Till We Can Keep an Animal
2009: Zinaid Meeran, Saracen at the Gates 
2010: James Clelland, Deeper than Colour
2011/12: Ashraf Kagee, Khalil's Journey 
2013: Penny Busetto, The Story of Anna P, as Told by Herself
2014: Andrew Miller, Dub Steps

Dinaane Debut Fiction Award
2015/2016: Tammy Baikie, Selling LipService
2019: Mubanga Kalimamukwento, The Mourning Bird 
2020: Resoketswe Manenzhe, Scatterlings

Notes

External links
Dinaane Debut Fiction Award, official site

Awards established in 2004
Fiction awards
First book awards
South African literary awards